State Route 276 (SR 276), also known as Thompson Creek Road, is a short  long north-south state highway in eastern Bedford County, Tennessee, United States. It connects the community of Raus, and SR 130, with U.S. Route 41A (US 41A). It is a two-lane highway for its entire length and traverses rural and flat farmland for the majority of its course.

Major intersections

References

276
Transportation in Bedford County, Tennessee